MS Color Fantasy is a cruiseferry owned and operated by Color Line on their route between Oslo in Norway and Kiel in Germany. The ship was built in Finland at Aker Finnyards Turku Shipyard in 2004. Color Fantasy is currently the world's second largest cruiseferry, surpassed only by her sister ship, the MS Color Magic.

Specification

Main dimensions 
Length overall: 223.90 m
Length btw.pp: 202.66 m
Breadth, wl mld: 35.00 m
Height to deck 3: 9.5/9.7 m
Height to deck 7: 21.9 m
Draught, design: 6.8 m
Draught, scantlings: 7.0 m
Deadweight: 5000 t
Tonnage: estimate GT: 75,027
Speed (90%MCR,15%SM) 22.1kn

Passengers and crew 
Number of Passengers: 2750
Number of Passengers Cabins: 968
Cabins outside: 492
Cabins atrium: 120
Cabins inside: 356
Number of Crew: 250
Number of Crew cabins: 248

Main equipment and machinery 
Mechanical Propulsion Machinery: 4 x 7800 kW Diesel engines
Propulsion power, about: 31200 kW
Aux Power plant: 4 x 2450 kVA Diesel generators
Main generator power: 9800 kVA, 690 V
Shaft generators, manoeuvring only: 2 x 6000 kVA, 6600 V
Emergency Diesel Generator Set: 900 kvA
Bow Thrusters: 3 x 2200 kW, 6600 V
Aft thrusters: 2x 1000 kW, 6600 V

Cargo 
Trailers, Deck 3: 1030 lm
Trailers, Deck 2: 240 lm
Total trailer lanemeters: 1270 lm
Cars, Deck 5: 200 cars
Cars, Deck 4: 258 cars
Cars, Deck 3: 292 cars
Car capacity: 750 cars

Class notation 
+1A1 ICE 1B, Carferry A, E0, NAUT-OC, RP, Clean, F-M, Comf-V(1)

See also
Largest ferries of Europe

External links 

Color Line official website

Ferries of Norway
Cruiseferries
Ships built in Turku
Water transport in Oslo
Color Line (ferry operator)
Merchant ships of Norway